Bulou Salote Vavaitamana née Misikini (died 4 December 2005) was a paramount chief of Vabea, and the district of Ono, Kadavu, Fiji.  In 1979, she succeeded her uncle, Ratu IlLotimasi Verenakadavu, as Tui Ono, or Chief of Ono, becoming the first female chief in the village and the district.  She was chosen despite being only the third eldest of five sisters and a late brother.

Vavaitamana, who was in her 80s, died at Colonial War Memorial Hospital on 4 December 2005, after collapsing while delivering an address at a village function at Nabua the day before.  She is to be buried at the Sautabu o' Nakoroicake chiefly burial ground in her home village of Vabea.

She was taken to her chiefly burial ground by the Paramount Chief of the Burebasaga Confederacy, Roko Tui Dreketi Ro Teimumu Kepa, a relative according to oral history recognised by both. She was succeeded as Tui Ono by Bulou Elenoa Savunoko Misikini. 

Fijian chiefs
People from Kadavu Province
2005 deaths
Year of birth missing